The Very Late Afternoon of a Faun is a 1983 Czechoslovak comedy film adapted from the Jiří Brdečka 1966 novel of the same name; directed by Věra Chytilová. This was Chytilová's only post Soviet invasion collaboration with screenwriter Ester Krumbachová.

Cast
 Leoš Suchařípa as Faun
 Libuše Pospíšilová as Boss
 Vlasta Špicnerová as Vlasta
 Jirí Hálek as Josef, Faun's friend
 Ivan Vyskočil as Tonda, colleague
 František Kovářík as Starik
 Alena Ambrová as Alenka
 Tereza Kučerová as Tereza
 Ivana Chýlková as Katerina
 Stanislava Coufalová as Zdenička
 Marie Vápeníková as Petra
 Jana Špaňurová as Young lady on the bridge
 Ella Šárková as Anita

References

1983 comedy films
1983 films
1980s Czech-language films
Czechoslovak comedy films
Films directed by Věra Chytilová
Czech comedy films
1980s Czech films